Swinburne, Smith and Company was a railroad locomotive manufacturing company of the mid-19th century.  The company was founded in 1845, in Paterson, New Jersey, by a partnership between William Swinburne and Samuel Smith. Swinburne had been a pattern maker for Rogers, Ketchum and Grosvenor of Paterson, who worked his way up to become shop foreman. Smith was foreman moulder at Rogers.

The company's first major client was the Erie Railway. Other customers included the Delaware, Lackawanna and Western Railroad and the Chicago and Alton Railroad.

Swinburne remained in business for only a decade, failing with the Panic of 1857.  Afterwards, the firm reorganized, with James Jackson joining the partnership, and became the	New Jersey Locomotive and Machine Company. John Brandt was the superintendent and principal design engineer. Among the engines produced by the firm is the William Crooks of the Great Northern Railway, which is the sole surviving engine built by the firm.

In 1863 the company experienced financial difficulties. Banker David B. Grant took control of the company and changed its name to Grant Locomotive Works.

References

Manufacturing companies established in 1845
Manufacturing companies disestablished in 1863
American companies established in 1845
American companies disestablished in 1863
Defunct companies based in New Jersey
Economy of Paterson, New Jersey
History of Paterson, New Jersey
Defunct locomotive manufacturers of the United States
Transportation in Paterson, New Jersey
1845 establishments in New Jersey
1863 disestablishments in New Jersey